Daniel Alonso (born 18 April 1956) is a Uruguayan footballer. He played in four matches for the Uruguay national football team in 1979. He was also part of Uruguay's squad for the 1979 Copa América tournament.

References

External links
 

1956 births
Living people
Uruguayan footballers
Uruguay international footballers
Association football forwards
Footballers from Montevideo